The Havre de Grace Colored School Museum and Cultural Center is located at 555 Alliance Street, Havre de Grace, Maryland, in the buildings of the former Havre de Grace Colored High School. The buildings have been partially restored and in 2022 donations were being sought to complete the work.

School history 
The Havre de Grace Colored School opened in 1912 in a one-room frame building. It was built with $1500 raised by the Black community, plus $200 from the city of Havre de Grace. It was, during the Jim Crow period, one of more than 14 grammar schools for African-American children in Harford County. There was no high school for them in the county; Black parents of means sent their children to Baltimore or Philadelphia for high school.

In 1930, a coalition of African-American parents, teachers, civic leaders, and white state lawmakers established Havre de Grace Colored High School, the county's first secondary school for Black children. With the addition in 1936 of a nondescript, one-story brick annex to the one-room schoolhouse, the new high school quickly became a source of pride for the Black community, seen as the best tool for their children's advancement. Although African-American children had a new school, they still had to rely on outdated and second-hand books and equipment handed down by schools attended by white children. The school had no sports facility. At the beginning there was no school bus, and students were responsible for their own transportation.

The poet Langston Hughes spoke at the school several times; he passed through Havre de Grace frequently while studying at nearby Lincoln University (Pennsylvania). He was a close friend and fraternity brother of the school's principal, Leon Roye.

In 1953 the school closed, and all Colored Schools in Havre de Grace, both elementary and high, combined to form the Havre de Grace Consolidated School, at a new location. In 1965, Harford County schools were integrated and the segregated Black schools closed. The buildings were used as a physician's office. After his death in 2015, the buildings were transferred to the non-profit Museum project.

Havre de Grace Colored School Museum and Cultural Center 
With help from the architecture department at Morgan State University, and the Havre de Grace Colored School Foundation; they collected and archived donations of photos, diplomas, books, documents, and other artifacts from alumni. The Havre de Grace Colored School Museum and Cultural Center opened to the public in the spring of 2019.

Media

References

Further reading

External links
 Museum Web site

Museums in Harford County, Maryland
Schools in Harford County, Maryland
Educational institutions established in 1912
Educational institutions disestablished in 1953
African-American history of Maryland
Buildings and structures in Havre de Grace, Maryland
Defunct black public schools in the United States that closed when schools were integrated
Defunct schools in Maryland